Thomas Pedersen (born 6 June 1980) is a Danish handballer, currently playing for Danish Handball League side Skjern Håndbold. He has previously played for league rivals GOG Svendborg and Nordsjælland Håndbold.

During his youth career, Pedersen played numerous matches for the Danish national youth teams.

External links
 Player info

1980 births
Living people
Danish male handball players